Flight 422 may refer to:

Air France Flight 422, a flight which crashed near Bogotá, Colombia, in 1998
Kuwait Airways Flight 422, a flight hijacked over the Gulf of Oman in 1988, leading to one of the longest skyjackings on record
Merpati Nusantara Airlines Flight 422, a 1994 flight that overshot the runway at Indonesia's Achmad Yani International Airport

0422